Tantra, or tantric massage, are two defined massages developed in Berlin in 1977. Erotic massage which incorporates elements from the neotantric movement in the Western world massages the primary erogenous zones of the body, those being the mouth, the phallus (penis), the vagina and the anus.

Tantric massage is also known as a physical act of touch that intends to enlighten those interacting in it by harnessing sexual energy within the body. 

There is no interaction between giver (the practitioner) and the receiver. To understand tantra massage and tantra erotic massage one must understand the difference between sensual and sexual. Andro insisted on the sensual because the sexual had its place outside tantra massage and tantra erotic massage.

Shakti Verah Andro's direct student and founder of PeaceQuiet states that Tantra massage and tantra erotic massages are spaces created for awareness and self discovery and  pleasure stand as a mere biproduct. 

The neotantric movement seems to centre its attention on sexuality while tantra massage and tantra erotic massage is to focus on self discovery. This is a less known and much less understood teaching that practitioners themselves often fail to understand partly due to the fixation surrounding sexuality and partly because self discovery needs years of hard work that not many are willing to invest in when sensuality alone sells.

Tantra massage
The massage includes various techniques from different schools of massage with elements from yoga, bioenergetics, and sexual therapy. According to the Tantric Massage Association, it was developed in the 1980s by Andro Andreas Rothe, founder of Diamond Lotus Tantra Lounge, the first Tantra institute in Germany (1977).

The client or the receiver of a tantra massage is not a giver. Their duty is to receive the massage and surrender to the rediscovery of senses, feelings and emotions. The process combines the feeling of well-being, associated with deep relaxation, as people come to resolve issues related to relationships, self esteem and sexual life.

According to the Tantric Massage Association Berlin, tantra massage is based on ideas taken from the work of Wilhelm Reich, Carl Jung, Carl Rogers and Alexander Lowen. Other sources of inspiration included the work of Mantak Chia, Joseph Kramer – who developed the "Lingam massage" and "Taoist Erotic Massage" – and Annie Sprinkle, who developed the "Yoni massage". Andro Rothé developed Tantra Massage, Tantra Erotic Massage and the less known Yin Yang Massage. Tantra massage is not a sexual exchange, but there is a giver and a receiver, where the receiver is supposed to enjoy the massage completely passively.

See also
Bodywork
Erotic massage
Neotantra
Sex therapy
Tantra

References

Further reading
Stubbs, Kenneth Ray (1993). Tantric Massage: An Illustrated Manual for Meditative Sexuality. Massage Next Door - Authentic Tantric blogger and provider in LondonSecret Garden Publishing. 

Erotic massage
Neotantra
New Age practices
Sex therapy

de:Tantramassage